The authoritarian personality is a personality type characterized by a disposition to treat authority figures with unquestioning obedience and respect. Conceptually, the term authoritarian personality originated from the writings of Erich Fromm, and usually is applied to people who exhibit a strict and oppressive personality towards their subordinates.

Historical origins
In The Authoritarian Personality (1950), Theodor W. Adorno and Else Frenkel-Brunswik, Daniel Levinson and Nevitt Sanford proposed a personality type that involved the "potentially fascistic individual." The historical background that influenced the theoretical development of the authoritarian personality included the rise of fascism in the 1930s, the Second World War (1939–1945), and the Holocaust, which indicated that the fascistic individual was psychologically susceptible to the ideology of anti-Semitism and to the emotional appeal of anti-democratic politics. Known as the Berkeley studies, the researches of Adorno and Frenkel-Brunswik, and of Levinson and Sanford concentrated upon prejudice, which they studied within psychoanalytic and psychosocial frameworks of Freudian and Frommian theories.

Although the term was first coined in 1950, different portrayals of the authoritarian personality type have been made before. One example is Der Untertan, a famous German novel, which draws its inspiration for its authoritarian protagonist from the German Kaiser Wilhelm II. The book shows that the idea for an authoritarian personality type predates fascism.

The authoritarian personality has a strict superego, which controls a weak ego that is unable to cope with the strong impulses of the id. The resulting intrapsychic conflicts cause personal insecurities, which result in the superego adhering to externally imposed conventional norms (conventionalism), and unquestioning obedience to the authorities who impose and administer the social norms of society (authoritarian submission). The ego-defense mechanism of psychological projection arises when the authoritarian person avoids self-reference to the anxiety-producing impulse(s) of the id, by projecting the impulse(s) onto the "inferior" minority social-groups of the culture (projectivity), which are expressed by way of greatly evaluative and harshly judgmental beliefs (power and toughness) and rigid stereotype.

The authoritarian person also presents a cynical and disdainful view of humanity, and a need to wield power and be tough, which arise from the anxieties produced by the perceived lapses of people who do not abide by the conventions and social norms of society (destructiveness and cynicism); a general tendency to focus upon people who violate the value system, and to act oppressively against them (authoritarian aggression); anti-intellectualism, a general opposition to the subjective and imaginative tendencies of the mind (anti-intraception); a tendency to believe in mystic determination (superstition); and an exaggerated concern with sexual promiscuity.
 
In human psychological development, the formation of the authoritarian personality occurs within the first years of a child's life, strongly influenced and shaped by the parents' personalities and the organizational structure of the child's family; thus, parent-child relations that are "hierarchical, authoritarian, [and] exploitative" can result in a child developing an authoritarian personality. Authoritarian-personality characteristics are fostered by parents who have a psychological need for domination, and who harshly threaten their child to compel obedience to conventional behaviors. Moreover, such domineering parents also are preoccupied with social status, a concern they communicate by having the child follow rigid, external rules. In consequence of such domination, the child suffers emotionally from the suppression of his or her feelings of aggression and resentment towards the domineering parents, whom the child reverently idealizes, but does not criticize. Such personalities may also be related to studies in preschool children of personality and political views as reported by scientists in 2006 which concluded that some children described as being "somewhat dominating" were later found, as adults, to be "relatively liberal", and those described as "relatively over-controlled" were later found, as adults, to be "relatively conservative"; in the words of the researchers, "Preschool children who 20 years later were relatively liberal were characterized as: developing close relationships, self-reliant, energetic, somewhat dominating, relatively under-controlled, and resilient. Preschool children subsequently relatively conservative at age 23 were described as: feeling easily victimized, easily offended, indecisive, fearful, rigid, inhibited, and relatively over-controlled and vulnerable."

Links to gender inequality
According to a study by Brandt and Henry, there is a direct correlation between the rates of gender inequality and the levels of authoritarian ideas in the male and female populations. It was found that in countries with less gender equality where individualism was encouraged and men occupied the dominant societal roles, women were more likely to support traits such as obedience which would allow them to survive in an authoritarian environment and less likely to encourage ideas such as independence and imagination. In countries with higher levels of gender equality, men held less authoritarian views. It is theorized that this occurs due to the stigma attached to individuals who question the cultural norms set by the dominant individuals and establishments in an authoritarian society as a way to prevent the psychological stress caused by the active ostracizing of the stigmatized individuals.

Issues with Brandt and Henry's study is that the countries with the highest levels of egalitarianism, which are the Scandinavian countries, have more men in positions of power in private sector roles such as management than the US. Individualism is far more encouraged in the US and enforced societal gender roles are under attack far more in places such as Sweden and Denmark.

Interpretations
Bob Altemeyer used the right-wing authoritarianism (RWA) scale, to identify, measure, and quantify the personality traits of authoritarian people. The political personality type identified with the RWA scale indicates the existence of three psychological tendencies and attitudinal clusters characteristic of the authoritarian personality: (i) Submission to legitimate authorities; (ii) Aggression towards minority groups whom authorities identified as targets for sanctioned political violence; and (iii) Adherence to cultural values and political beliefs endorsed by the authorities. As measured with the NEO-PI-R Openness scale, the research indicates a negative correlation (r=0.57) between the personality trait of "openness to experience", of the Five Factor Model of the human personality.

The research of Jost, Glaser, Arie W. Kruglanski, and Sulloway (2003) indicates that authoritarianism and right-wing authoritarianism are ideological constructs for social cognition, by which political conservatives view people who are the Other who is not the Self. That the authoritarian personality and the conservative personality share two, core traits: (i) resistance to change (social, political. economic), and (ii) justification for social inequality among the members of society. Conservatives have a psychological need to manage existential uncertainty and threats with situational motives (striving for dominance in social hierarchies) and with dispositional motives (self-esteem and the management of fear).

The research on ideology, politics, and racist prejudice, by John Duckitt and Chris Sibley, identified two types of authoritarian worldview: (i) that the social world is dangerous, which leads to right-wing authoritarianism; and (ii) that the world is a ruthlessly competitive jungle, which leads to social dominance orientation. In a meta-analysis of the research, Sibley and Duckitt explained that the social-dominance orientation scale helps to measure the generalization of prejudice and other authoritarian attitudes that can exist within social groups. Although both the right-wing authoritarianism scale and the social-dominance orientation scale can accurately measure authoritarian personalities, the scales usually are not correlated.

Criticism

Early research
These researchers' most noteworthy measurement for authoritarianism is the F-scale, designed to tap a set of beliefs thought to be associated with authoritarianism without the need for specific out-groups indicated. Kirscht and Dillehay (1967) outlined several problems with the Berkeley studies, including response bias. Response bias results from the F-scale being uniformly worded in a confirming direction. Hence, if one tends to respond in agreement with items, regardless of their content, one is rated as an authoritarian by such a test. Several studies have shown that more variance of the F-scale can be explained by response bias than the content of the items (Kirscht & Dillehay, 1967).

Actual assessment of 16 Nazi criminals at Nuremberg trials (reported in Zillmer, et al., 1995) conducted by clinicians using the Rorschach test, and in one study, the F scale for authoritarianism, found that these ex-Nazis score high on three dimensions (anti-intraception, superstition and stereotyping, and projectivity), but not all nine dimensions as the theory predicted.

One of the first applications of the authoritarian scales in academia was by Stern and colleagues, in the early 1950s, at the University of Chicago. The hypothesized prediction was that "authoritarian" students would have difficulty in the sciences and humanities, and use of an attitudinal scale was a successful predictor.

Validity
Among the criticisms of the sociologic theory presented in The Authoritarian Personality (1950) are the validity of the psychoanalytic interpretation of personality; methodological inadequacies of the California F-scale personality test; and bias that authoritarianism exists only in the right wing of the political spectrum. In addition an analysis examining the authoritarian personality approach written by C.G. Sibley and J. Duckitt reported that more recent research has produced two more effective scales of measurement for authoritative personalities. The first scale is called the Right Wing Authoritarianism (RWA) and the second is called the Social Dominance Orientation (SDO). They have proved to be highly reliable in predicting prejudice and other characteristics associated with authoritative personalities. In The Anti-authoritarian Personality (1977) W.P. Kreml found stylistic similarities between authoritarians and anti-authoritarians (dogmatism, rigidity, etc.), and that variable constructs, such as (a) the relative need for order, (b) the relative need for power, (c) the rejection or acceptance of impulse, and (d) extroversion-versus-introversion, differentiated the two types of personality, and could underpin a full-spectrum psycho-political theory.

Wiggins provided an insightful explanation of how the authoritarian construct is an example of the synthetic approach to personality assessment. In short, in the synthetic approach, the assumption is that those with authoritarian personality characteristics are assessed with researcher's intuitive model of what characteristics fit the criterion role requirements of the predicted situation (support of Fascism). Hence, it is not a completely empirical approach to prediction, but rather based on "arm chair" situational analysis of the criteria, and intuited psychological characteristics to be assessed that fit the situation. More recently, Jost, Glaser, Kruglanski, and Sulloway (2003) have presented how the traditional research in authoritarianism or conservatism has confounded the psychological variables (e.g., personality characteristics) with the political criteria (conservative attitudes). Hence the scales measuring individual differences on authoritarianism often include the criteria attitudinal statements of political ideologies.

The personality construct for the authoritarian personality proposed that the social environment influenced the expression of prejudice, based upon the social forces of the time, because the authoritarian person's ideology is created within the culture. Yet, in "The Social Being and Social Psychology" (1998) S. Taylor said that the hypothesized interaction of society and the authoritarian person was lost to the subsequent research that used the F-scale in differential psychological studies. Given the science of personality assessment, the variety of methods Adorno, et al. used are now unsupported, and might explain that lack of empirical studies using the F-scale or the other scales developed by Adorno et al. in subsequent research. An example of the social environment impact is presented by Gibb (1969) in his critique of personality traits and leadership, where a study by Katz suggested that the social situation can override personality differences. In the study, groups of black and white students were formed. Some mixed racial groups had students scoring high authoritarian F scores, and in other mixed groups, low F score students. Comparisons of high authoritarian white students to those not scoring authoritarian indicated that the former student type were more cooperative and less willing to endorse stereotypes towards blacks. Situational norms against prejudicial perceptions might have influenced authoritarian students to act less prejudicial in order to conform to the prescribed norm. Altemeyer's analytical research indicated that of the nine personality components hypothesized, only three components correlated: (i) authoritarian submission, (ii) authoritarian aggression, and (iii) conventionalism.

Prevalence

Western countries
In 2021, Morning Consult (an American data intelligence company) published the results of a survey measuring the levels of authoritarianism in adults in America and seven other Western countries. The study used Bob Altemeyer's right-wing authoritarianism scale, but they omitted the following two statements from Altemeyer's scale: (1) "The established authorities generally turn out to be right about things, while the radicals and protestors are usually just "loud mouths" showing off their ignorance"; and (2) "Women should have to promise to obey their husbands when they get married." Morning Consult's scale thus had just 20 items, with a score range of 20 to 180 points. Morning Consult found that 25.6% of American adults qualify as "high RWA" (scoring between 111 and 180 points), while 13.4% of American adults qualify as "low RWA" (scoring 20 to 63 points).

United States
In a 2009 book, Marc J. Hetherington and Jonathan D. Weiler identified evangelical Christians as the most authoritarian of voting blocs in the United States.  Furthermore, the former Confederate states (ie "the South") showed higher levels of authoritarianism than the rest.  Rural populations tend to be more authoritarian than urban ones. The authoritarianism levels of these demographics were assessed with four items that appeared in the American National Election Studies:

 Please tell me which one you think is more important for a child to have: INDEPENDENCE or RESPECT FOR ELDERS
 Please tell me which one you think is more important for a child to have: CURIOSITY or GOOD MANNERS
 Please tell me which one you think is more important for a child to have: OBEDIENCE or SELF-RELIANCE
 Please tell me which one you think is more important for a child to have: BEING CONSIDERATE or WELL BEHAVED

See also

References

Bibliography

External links
Professor Bob Altemeyer's The Authoritarians – An American on-line book about the corruption of Congress of the United States, the destruction of traditional conservatism by authoritarianism, the un-democratic push of the agenda of the "Religious Right" and their amoral authoritarian leaders, and the United States standing at a crossroads as the 2008 federal election approaches.
John Dean Exposes The Authoritarians – The first in a five-part series on America's authoritarians based on John Dean's Conservatives Without Conscience.
Authoritarianism and Polarization in American Politics by Marc Hetherington and Jonathan Weiler Excerpt.
Bob Altemeyer and Jonathan Shockley: A Discussion on Authoritarianism on WBAI
Баязитов Р.Ф. Авторитарный стереотип: сущность и проявления в социальных взаимодействиях.  – Нижнекамск: Изд-во НМИ, 2006.  – 175 с.

Psychological theories
Personality traits
Authoritarianism
Anti-social behaviour
Abuse
Workplace bullying
Collectivism
Moral psychology
Psychological attitude